Stefano Faustini (born 5 August 1968 in Brescia) is a former Italian cyclist.

Major results

1995
 1st Trofeo Gianfranco Bianchin
 1st Piccolo Giro di Lombardia
 2nd Overall Giro della Valle d'Aosta
1st Stages 1 & 5
1996
 1st Gran Premio Palio del Recioto
 1st Tour du Lac Léman
 3rd Overall Settimana Ciclistica Lombarda
 5th Overall Vuelta a España
 7th Overall Giro d'Italia
1998
 1st Wartenberg-Rundfahrt
 2nd Giro di Toscana
 2nd Overall Giro d'Abruzzo

General classification results timeline

References

1968 births
Living people
Italian male cyclists
Cyclists from Brescia